Annet Katusiime Mugisha (born in 1974) is a Ugandan politician. She is a member of the 11th Parliament of Uganda, representing the Bushenyi District.

Early life and education 
Mugisha was born in 1974, in the village of Kantunda in the Bumbaire sub-county of the Bushenyi District in the Republic of Uganda.
She has a degree in Guidance and Counselling from Uganda Martyrs University, a private Catholic-owned University located at Nkozi, Uganda. In 2021, she began to pursue a Master's in Business Administration (MBA) at Uganda Martyrs University.

Career

Professional 
Mugisha previously worked as a primary school teacher and currently runs a catering company. She is a psychologist by profession, a counsellor, investor, and preacher.
She and her husband Silver Mugisha, the CEO and Managing Director of the Ugandan National Water and Sewerage Corporation, founded Bamugisha Community Welfare Ltd., an NGO whose purposes are reportedly to increase access to education, improve household income, and provide food security and environmental protection for the residents of the Bushenyi District.

Political 
Mugisha is affiliated with the National Resistance Movement (NRM) party of Uganda. Her political career began with the 2021 parliamentary elections, in which she prevailed against Mary Karooro Okurut in the NRM primaries and subsequently won a seat in the general parliamentary election. While campaigning for the primary election, Mugisha was accused of using forged academic credentials in a petition led by Zeddy Gakyalo and Phillip Murwani. Mugisha denied the accusations, justifying the claimed inconsistencies in her documents with a legal change of name from Musoga to Mugisha.

References 

1974 births
Living people
21st-century Ugandan politicians